Dušan Stojiljković is a Serbian politician. Elected to the National Assembly of Serbia in 2022 as a member of the far-right Serbian Party Oathkeepers (Srpska stranka Zavetnici, SSZ), he left the party in October 2022 and sat as an independent until February 2023, when he joined the Serbian Progressive Party.

Private career
Stojiljković is a graduated manager. He lives in the Belgrade municipality of Rakovica.

Politician
Stojiljković appeared in the third position on the SSZ's electoral list in the 2020 Serbian parliamentary election. The list did not cross the electoral threshold to win representation in the assembly. He also appeared in the tenth position on the party's list for the Rakovica municipal assembly in the concurrent 2020 local elections and was not elected when list won two seats.

He again appeared in the third position on the SSZ's list in the 2022 parliamentary election and was elected when the list won ten seats. The Serbian Progressive Party (Srpska napredna stranka, SNS) and its allies won the election, and the SSZ serves in opposition. Stojiljković is a deputy member of the committee on finance, state budget, and control of public spending.

Stojiljković also received the third position on the SSZ's list for the City Assembly of Belgrade in the 2022 city election and was elected when the list won four seats. He resigned soon after the assembly convened.

He left the SSZ on 24 October 2022, citing differences with party spokesperson Milica Đurđević Stamenkovski.

References

1982 births
Living people
Politicians from Belgrade
Members of the National Assembly (Serbia)
Members of the City Assembly of Belgrade
Serbian Party Oathkeepers politicians